

Traditional festivals in the lunar year

1st lunar month

last day of previous year to 5th day of 1st lunar month: Tết festival.
2nd day of 1st lunar month: Cửa Ông temple Festival, Cửa Ông ward, Cẩm Phả, Quảng Ninh Province
5th day of 1st lunar month: Đống Đa Festival, Đống Đa District, Hà Nội capital.
5th day to 10th day of 1st lunar month: Liễu Đôi wrestle Festival, Liễu Đôi village, Liêm Túc commune, Thanh Liêm District, Hà Nam Province
6th day of 1st lunar month- last day of 3rd lunar month: Hương Pagoda Festival, Hương Sơn commune, Mỹ Đức District, Hà Tây Province
6th day to 16th day of 1st lunar month: Cổ Loa Temple Festival, Cổ Loa commune, Đông Anh District, Hà Nội capital
9th day and 10th day of 1st lunar month: Ba Bể Lake Festival, Ba Bể Lake, Ba Bể District, Bắc Kạn Province
9th day to 11th day of 1st lunar month: Triều Khúc village Festival, Triều Khúc village, Hà Nội capital
10th day of 1st lunar month: Sình village Festival, Sình village, Phú Mậu commune, Phú Vang District, Thừa Thiên–Huế Province
10th day of 1st lunar month to the last day of 3rd lunar month: Yên Tử Festival, Yên Tử mountain, Thượng Yên Công commune, Uông Bí, Quảng Ninh Province
13th day of 1st lunar month: Lim Festival, Lũng Giang commune, Tiên Sơn District, Bắc Ninh Province
13th day and 15th day of 1st lunar month: Bà Thiên Hậu Pagoda Festival, Lái Thiêu commune, Thủ Dầu Một, Bình Dương Province
15th day of 1st lunar month: Thượng temple Festival, Lào Cai Province
18th day and 19th day of 1st lunar month: Bà Đen Mountain Festival, Bà Đen mountain, Tây Ninh Province

2nd lunar month
10th day of 1st lunar month to the last day of 3rd lunar month: Yên Tử Festival, Yên Tử mountain, Thượng Yên Công commune, Uông Bí, Quảng Ninh Province
3rd day to 6th day of 2nd lunar month: Đồng Nhân temple Festival, Hai Bà Trưng District, Hà Nội capital
12th day to 14th day of 2nd lunar month: Phương Viên festival
14th day to 16th day of 2nd lunar month: Cuông temple Festival, Diễn An commune, Diễn Châu District, Nghệ An Province
18th day to 20th day of 2nd lunar month: Quán Thế Âm Festival, Ngũ Hành Sơn mountain, Đà Nẵng city.

3rd lunar month
10th day of 1st lunar month to the last day of 3rd lunar month: Yên Tử Festival, Yên Tử mountain, Thượng Yên Công commune, Uông Bí, Quảng Ninh Province
3rd lunar month: Central Highland Elephant Racing, Đôn village, Đắk Lắk Province
3rd day to 8th day of 3rd lunar month: Phủ Dày Festival, Kim Thái commune, Vụ Bản District, Nam Định Province
4th day to 7th day of 3rd lunar month: Thầy pagoda Festival, Sài Sơn commune, Quốc Oai District, Hà Tây Province
10th day of 3rd lunar month: Hùng Kings' Festival, Hùng Vương Temple, Phú Thọ Province
10th day of 3rd lunar month: Trường Yên Festival, Hoa Lư District, Ninh Bình Province
10th day to 12th day of 3rd lunar month: Chử Đồng Tử Temple Festival, Đa Hoà village, Châu Giang District, Hưng Yên Province
15th day of 3rd lunar month: Đô Temple Festival, Đình Bảng village, Từ Sơn District, Bắc Ninh Province
23rd day of 3rd lunar month: Lệ Mật village Festival, Lệ Mật village, Việt Hưng commune, Gia Lâm District, Hà Nội capital.

4th lunar month
9th day of 4th lunar month: Gióng temple Festival, Phù Đổng temple, Gia Lâm District, Hà Noi capital
23rd day to 25th day of 4th lunar month: Bà Chúa Xứ Festival, Sam mountain, Châu Đốc District, An Giang Province

5th lunar month
Mid-year festival (5/5 Lunar) (Tết Đoan Ngọ)

6th lunar month

7th lunar month
 15th day of 7th lunar month:: Tết Trung Nguyên or Lễ Vu Lan

8th lunar month
9th day of 8th lunar month: Đồ Sơn buffalo fight Festival, Đồ Sơn, Hải Phòng city.
 15th day of 8th lunar month: Tết Trung Thu
16th day to 20th day of 8th lunar month: Kiếp Bạc temple Festival, Lê Lợi commune, Chí Linh District, Hải Dương city, Hải Dương Province.

9th lunar month
13th day to 15th of 9th lunar month: Keo pagoda Festival, Duy Nhất commune, Vũ Thư District, Thái Bình Province

10th lunar month
Okomboc fullmoon in Sóc Trăng Province

11th lunar month
Full Moon

12th lunar month
Christmas

Traditional festivals in the Cham calendar

7th month
7th month in Champa calendar: Kate Festival of Champa ethnic minority.

Traditional festivals in the Khmer calendar
 Chol Chnam Thmey, Cambodian New Year

Modern festivals
Huế Festival, Huế city, Thừa Thiên–Huế Province
Flower Festival, Đà Lạt city, Lâm Đồng Province
August, Nha Trang- Rendevouz Festival, Nha Trang city, Khánh Hòa Province.

Public holidays

 
Traditional